Oğulcan Ülgün (born 11 May 1998) is a Turkish professional footballer who plays as a defensive midfielder for the Turkish club Konyaspor.

Professional career
A youth product of Altınordu since 2009, Ülgün began his senior career with the club and made over 100 appearances for them in his first 5 seasons with them. He transferred to Konyaspor on 25 June 2021, signing a 3 year contract. He made his professional debut with Konyaspor in a 2–1 Süper Lig win over İstanbul Başakşehir on 22 August 2021.

References

External links
 
 
 

1998 births
Living people
Footballers from Istanbul
Turkish footballers
Turkey under-21 international footballers
Konyaspor footballers
Süper Lig players
TFF First League players
Association football midfielders